Lego Indiana Jones 2: The Adventure Continues is a 2009 action-adventure video game developed by TT Fusion and published by LucasArts for the Nintendo DS and PlayStation Portable. It is a handheld version of the console game of the same name, Lego Indiana Jones 2: The Adventure Continues.

Gameplay 

Unlike the console version, the game's handheld release covers only the Kingdom of the Crystal Skull, dividing it into three chapters. The release plays akin to a sidescroller, in that the levels primarily move left and right, rather than forward. The version does this while also employing the same design elements in the main release like puzzles, dispersed enemies, and vehicles. It also adapts wholly different scenes for levels. Since it only adapts one film, the version has a single hub, which is set on an island. The release also makes use of local online co-op, where the game is run on multiple nearby devices, instead of running on one device played by multiple people.

Reception 

Chris Roper of IGN rated the game 5.2/10 points, saying that the series had "lost its charm" by going portable. Saying that the handheld version offered a "completely different, and unfortunately worse" experience than on other platforms, he described it as "simply boring", with "wonky" controls and uninteresting level design. Calling it a "very linear experience", he commented on the game's lack of exploration, while criticizing the choice to only include Kingdom of the Crystal Skull. He noted a lack of Nintendo DS-specific controls on that version due to the game's dual-portable development.

Tony Capri of Cheat Code Central described the game as having puzzles that were "cryptic" and did not "quite fit in" with the rest of the game. Nathan Meunier of GamesRadar+ took issue with the game's controls, especially for its vehicle segments, but praised the graphics. Carolyn G. of Nintendo Power rated the DS version 5/10 points, praising some of the levels as having an impressive sense of scale, but remarking that the puzzles were too easy, and the touch-screen controls overly "finicky". She summed up the story's humor as falling flat most of the time. Nintendo Gamer rated the same version 63/100 points, calling it a "lovely bit of fanservice".

References 

2009 video games
Cooperative video games
Indiana Jones video games
Lego video games
LucasArts games
Multiplayer and single-player video games
Nintendo DS games
PlayStation Portable games
Video games developed in the United Kingdom